The Greatest Hits is a compilation album by Scottish rock band Texas, released on 23 October 2000. It was the band's first greatest hits album, featuring songs spanning their career from 1989 to 2000. Three new singles were also included: "In Demand", "Inner Smile" and "Guitar Song".

Two extra bonus tracks appear on the UK edition of the album that do not appear on the international edition. In territories where the group did not chart any major hits, the album was simply renamed Song Book. Four previously released songs ("So in Love with You", "So Called Friend", "Everyday Now" and "Prayer for You") were also re-recorded for this album.

The Greatest Hits peaked at number one in the UK, becoming the band's third album to do so. It has been certified 6× Platinum by the British Phonographic Industry for UK sales of 1,974,890 copies. The Greatest Hits was a big seller within the United Kingdom and was the 42nd best-selling album of the 2000s decade in the United Kingdom.

Track listing

Charts

Weekly charts

Year-end charts

Certifications

Notes

References

Greatest Hits, The
2000 greatest hits albums
Mercury Records compilation albums
2000 remix albums
2000 video albums
2000 live albums
Albums produced by Mike Hedges
Albums produced by David A. Stewart
Mercury Records remix albums
Mercury Records video albums
Mercury Records live albums